The Northern NSW State League Division 1 (known as the HIT Northern League One for sponsorship reasons) is a regional Australian semi-professional association football league comprising teams from New South Wales. The league sits at Level 2 on the Northern New South Wales league system (Level 3 of the overall Australian league system). The competition is administered by Northern NSW Football, the governing body of the sport in the northern region of the state (the southern region governed by Football NSW). Prior to 2014, the league was formally known as the New FM 1st Division from 1998 to 2013 and the Northern NSW Football League Division Two from 1948 to 1997.

Format
The competition consists of 9 teams, each of whom have a 1st-grade, Reserves, under-18s, under-16s, under-15s, under-14s and under-13s side. The regular season takes place over 20 rounds, with each team playing each other twice and each team get a bye round. The team that finishes first at the end of the 20 rounds is crowned Premiers.

The top 5 teams contest the Finals Series. The teams that progress meet in the grand final and the winner of that game is crowned the grand final winner.

Team History
The 2015 competition saw the introduction of 3 more teams into Northern NSW State League Division 1: Cooks Hill United FC, Kahibah FC and Wallsend FC.

2017 saw the promotion of New Lambton FC.

At the conclusion of the 2021 season, Cooks Hill United were promoted to NPL Northern NSW.

At the conclusion of the 2022 season, New Lambton FC were promoted to NPL Northern NSW.

Current Teams (2023)

Northern Inland (Youth)

References

 NEWFM 1st Division Home Page
 Northern NSW Football Federation Main Site

Soccer leagues in New South Wales